John Case is the pseudonym of Jim Hougan and Carolyn Hougan, husband and wife, both published authors in their own right.

Jim Hougan is also an investigative journalist and broadcaster. He lives in Afton, Virginia.

The joint writings of Jim and Carolyn have now ended following the death of Carolyn Hougan from cancer on February 25, 2007.

Bibliography
Under the pseudonym, the Hougans authored six novels:
The Genesis Code (1997)
The First Horseman (1998)
The Syndrome (2001; published as Trance State in the UK)
The Eighth Day (2002)
The Murder Artist (2004)
Ghost Dancer (2006; published as The Dance of Death in the UK)

References

External links 
 Biography of Jim Hougan with extracts from Secret Agenda
 The Official John Case website
 The Official Jim Hougan website

20th-century American novelists
Collective pseudonyms
21st-century American novelists
American male novelists
20th-century American male writers
21st-century American male writers